Sheikh Juma bin Dalmook Al Maktoum((born December 23, 1984) is a member of the ruling family of Dubai, and an Emirati sport shooter.

Biography
Juma Al-Maktoum is also an owner of thoroughbred racehorses. His silks are blue and yellow.

In 2013, Juma married his first wife Camélia El Bishry who is French with an Egyptian father  and a Moroccan mother. They have 3 children:Nouf,Maktoum and Noura.

References

External links
 

1984 births
Living people
Emirati male sport shooters
Trap and double trap shooters
Asian Games medalists in shooting
Shooters at the 2010 Asian Games
Shooters at the 2014 Asian Games
Shooters at the 2012 Summer Olympics
Olympic shooters of the United Arab Emirates
Asian Games silver medalists for the United Arab Emirates
Asian Games bronze medalists for the United Arab Emirates
Medalists at the 2010 Asian Games
Medalists at the 2014 Asian Games
Shooters at the 2018 Asian Games